Guanabara Bay is an oceanic bay located in Southeast Brazil in the state of Rio de Janeiro. On its western shore lie the cities of Rio de Janeiro and Duque de Caxias, and on its eastern shore the cities of Niterói and São Gonçalo. Four other municipalities surround the bay's shores.

The name Guanabara comes from the Tupi language, goanã-pará, from gwa "bay", plus nã "similar to" and ba'ra "sea". Other glosses include hidden water, lagoon of the sea, and bosom of the sea.

History

Guanabara Bay was first encountered by Europeans on January 1, 1502, when one of the Portuguese explorers Gaspar de Lemos and Gonçalo Coelho arrived on its shores. According to some historians, the name given by the exploration team to the bay was originally Ria de Janeiro "January's Lagoon", then a confusion took place between the word ria "lagoon" and rio "river". As a result, the name of the bay was soon fixed as Rio de Janeiro.
Later, the city was named after the bay. Natives of the Tamoio and Tupiniquim tribes inhabited the shores of the bay.

After the initial arrival of the Portuguese, no significant European settlements were established until French colonists and soldiers, under the Huguenot Admiral Nicolas Durand de Villegaignon invaded the region in 1555 to establish the France Antarctique. They stayed briefly on Lajes Island, then moved to Serigipe Island, near the shore, where they built Fort Coligny. After they were expelled by Portuguese military expeditions in 1563, the colonial government built fortifications in several points of Guanabara Bay, rendering it almost impregnable against a naval attack from the sea. They were the Santa Cruz, São João, Lajes and Villegaignon forts, forming a fearsome crossfire rectangle of big naval guns. Other islands were adapted by the Navy to host naval storehouses, hospitals, drydocks, oil reservoirs and the National Naval Academy.

Underwater exploration in the bay was disallowed by the Brazilian government in 1985 amid a dispute with an American treasure hunter, who claimed to have found evidence of a Roman shipwreck.

Description

There are more than 130 islands dotting the bay, including:

 Lajes
 Ilha do Governador – site of Rio de Janeiro's Galeão - Antônio Carlos Jobim International Airport
 Ilha de Paquetá
 Ilha das Cobras
 Flores
 Ilha Fiscal
 Ilha da Boa Viagem
 Villegagnon
 Fundão

The Port of Rio de Janeiro, as well as the city's two airports, Galeão - Antônio Carlos Jobim International Airport (on Governador Island) and Santos Dumont Airport (on reclaimed land next to downtown Rio), are located on its shores. The Federal University of Rio de Janeiro main campus is located on the artificial Fundão Island. A maze of smaller bridges interconnect the two largest islands, Fundão and Governador, to the mainland.

There is an Environmental Protection Area (APA), which is located mostly in the municipality of Guapimirim and given the name of Guapimirim APA.

Environment

Guanabara Bay's once rich and diversified ecosystem has suffered extensive damage in recent decades, particularly along its mangrove areas. The bay has been heavily impacted by urbanization, deforestation, and pollution of its waters with sewage, garbage, and oil spills.  As of 2014, more than 70% of the sewage from 12 million inhabitants of Rio de Janeiro now flows into the bay untreated.

There have been three major oil spills in Guanabara Bay. The most recent was in 2000 when a leaking Petrobras underwater pipeline released  of oil into the bay, destroying large swaths of the mangrove ecosystem.  Recovery measures are currently being attempted, but more than a decade after the incident, the mangrove areas have not returned to life.

One of the world's largest landfills is located at Jardim Gramacho adjacent to Guanabara Bay. It was closed in 2012 after 34 years of operation. The landfill attracted attention from environmentalists and it supported 1700 people scavenging for recyclable materials.

In June 2014 Dutch windsurfer and former Olympic and world champion Dorian van Rijsselberghe made an urgent appeal to  government and industry in the Netherlands to collaborate in cleaning up the bay, together with the Plastic Soup Foundation. The Dutch government picked up the message and formulated a Clean Urban Delta Initiative Rio de Janeiro  together with a consortium of Dutch industry, knowledge institutes and NGOs which will be presented to the Brazilian authorities in the State of Rio de Janeiro.

As part of the preparations for the 2016 Summer Olympics in Rio, the government was supposed to improve the conditions, but progress has been slow. There have been concerns that the efforts may only be short-term and abandoned following the Games, as there would be little political incentive to continue with them.

The marine ecosystem of Guanabara Bay was severely damaged; the bay was once a whaling ground, and today whales are no longer or rarely seen while Bryde's whales can be seen around the bay entrance. The bay is also home to a population of botos and this population faces severe risks of population decline.

References

Further reading

RGSSA catalogue. Bell, Alured Gray, 1870-1925  The Beautiful Rio de Janeiro. London : William Heinemann, 1914
'back to Rio'. RGSSA blog post, images of Guanabara Bay taken 1914

 
Bays of Brazil
Bays of the Atlantic Ocean
Landforms of Rio de Janeiro (state)
Geography of Rio de Janeiro (city)
Duque de Caxias, Rio de Janeiro
Niterói
Venues of the 2016 Summer Olympics
Olympic sailing venues
Cenozoic rifts and grabens
Cenozoic South America